Kinney Drugs is a chain of approximately 100 drugstores and pharmacies throughout central and northern New York, as well as Vermont. Its headquarters are located in Gouverneur, New York.

The company was founded in 1903 by Burt Orrin Kinney, a native of Gouverneur. The first drugstore was opened in Gouverneur, and the original store is still operating in the center of the village's business district.
The company opened stores across the region, and in 1962 built a distribution center in Gouverneur.

In 2008, Kinney Drugs became owned by its Employee Stock Option Plan and 401(k) plan.

As a regional drugstore, Kinney Drugs operates primarily throughout the metropolitan areas of Syracuse, Watertown, and Plattsburgh; though also maintains locations in Burlington and the northern half of the state of Vermont. Many locations are freestanding stores with drive-thru pharmacies. In some smaller towns such as Bomoseen, VT and  Old Forge, NY, Kinney's also operates pharmacies with a smaller selection of general merchandise.

Besides their drug stores, parent company KPH Healthcare Services operates ProAct prescription benefit management firm, HealthDirect institutional pharmacy services, Noble Health Services and HealthDirect mail order pharmacy services.

References

Pharmacies of the United States
Health care companies based in New York (state)
Pharmacy benefit management companies based in the United States
Retail companies established in 1903